Nauman Ijaz (Punjabi and ) is a Pakistani television and film actor, TV anchorperson, and TV show presenter. He is the recipient of several accolades including 10 Lux Style Awards, 7 Hum Awards and a President's Pride of Performance, which was awarded him in 2012.

As of 2017 he was hosting a prime time talk show on Neo News HD with the title of G Sarkar. Active since 1988, he has played many roles and has been a senior actor on state Television  PTV.

Early life 
Ijaz was born in and grew up in Icchra town, Lahore to a Punjabi family. His father worked in a movie theatre as a manager. He started his education at Cathedral High School, Lahore. Later he attended Divisional Public School, Model Town, Lahore. He completed his education from Forman Christian College and did Law from Punjab University, Lahore. He started his acting career in a small appearance in a drama serial in 1988.

Career
Ijaz began his acting career on PTV, with a short appearance in the direction of director Nusrat Thakur. He then did a TV serial from PTV (Quetta Centre). He then appeared in many different roles, including negative roles in the dramas Rihaee and Ullu Baraye Farokht Nahi. He then appeared in film Ramchand Pakistani (2008) where he romanced Nandita Das. Ijaz hosted a TV comedy show on PTV Home.  In 2012, Ijaz received a Pride of Performance award from the President of Pakistan, Asif Ali Zardari.

In 2014, he hosted a TV comedy show called Mazaaq Raat on Dunya news.

Filmography

Films

Television

Webseries

Host

Awards and accolades

Lux Style Awards

Other recognition 
 2012 - Pride of Performance by the President of Pakistan

References

External links
 

1965 births
Living people
Pakistani male television actors
Best Actor in a Negative Role Hum Award winners
Punjabi people
Pakistani male film actors
Male actors from Lahore
Recipients of the Pride of Performance
Hum Award winners
Forman Christian College alumni
University of the Punjab alumni
PTV Award winners